The Trento National High School (TNHS) is a public high school under the Department of Education of the Philippines located in Trento, Agusan del Sur, Mindanao, Philippines. It has 4 annexes, the Kapatungan National High School, Manat National High School, Salvacion National High School and Pulang-Lupa National High School located in the Municipality of Trento, Agusan del Sur.

The curricula offered by the school are Department of Science and Technology - Engineering and Science Education Program (DOST-ESEP) and Special Science Curriculum (SSC), Basic Education Curriculum (BEC) and the Technical Vocational Education (TVS/Tech. Voc.).

History

Forty years ago, the Barangay Council of Trento, headed by Ignacio Prochina, the Barangay Captain, conceived the idea of opening a Barangay high school. A resolution requesting the opening of high school was passed to the division office which was in Butuan. At that time, Agusan was not yet divided into Agusan del Norte and Agusan del Sur. The request was granted and Trento Barangay High School was opened on July 16, 1970.

There was only one full-time teacher appointed, Miss Nena A Lor, Mrs. Tuazon. She was followed by Necitas V. Logroño, and Josefina A. Lumanta. This was in 1970–1971. The enrollees were only 204. In the following year came Efigenia E. Calvez, Berlin S. Mipaña, now Mrs. Tecson, Gregorio A. Rances, and Nelita D. Julao, now Mrs. Improso.

Two years later, the school had its first graduation. Due to the increase of enrollment, the school needed a head teacher. Jose R. Oasan, who acted as the assistant principal, designated Nena A. Lor as the teacher-in-charge. That was in 1973. In 1975, she was promoted to head teacher.

After four years, the students and the teachers were made to vacate the building they borrowed from Trento Central Elementary School. They transferred to an unfinished building constructed out of the converted barrio market building; it had unfinished roofing and sand and gravel flooring.

They stayed there for a number of years. With the assistance extended by both the Barangay and local officials, the school acquired physical facilities. It is now the second year building. In the year 1976–1977, the old municipal building was also turned over to the school as a classroom building.

A number of classroom buildings were constructed by the PTA.

The school has continued to grow. Its names have included Trento Community High School, Trento Municipal High School and then Trento National High School.

At present, there are 2,556 students enrolled for the school year 2006–2007. There are 70 teachers headed by the full-fledged Secondary School Principal Leopoldo M. Pulido, P-III. The school has 20 buildings with 44 classrooms.

Today, Trento National High School is the 3rd largest secondary school in the Division of Agusan del Sur.

References

Schools in Agusan del Sur
Educational institutions established in 1970
High schools in the Philippines